Frederick Edward Smith (7 May 1926 – 6 February 2017) was an English footballer who played in the Football League in the 1940s and 1950s as a centre forward for Derby County, Sheffield United, Manchester City, Grimsby Town and Bradford City.

Football career 
Smith was born in Draycott, Derbyshire, and started his professional career at Derby County, before joining Sheffield United in March 1948. His most prolific season for the "Blades" was 1949–50, when he scored 16 goals from 29 league appearances, which helped United to finish third in the Second Division, missing out on promotion to arch-rivals Sheffield Wednesday by the narrowest of margins, 0.008 on goal average.

After five seasons with Sheffield United, he joined Manchester City in May 1952, moving on to Grimsby Town in September. At Grimsby, playing in the Third Division North, he scored 24 goals from 50 League appearances in two years, before spending one season with Bradford City.

References

External links
 

1926 births
2017 deaths
English footballers
Association football forwards
Bradford City A.F.C. players
Derby County F.C. players
English Football League players
Frickley Athletic F.C. players
Grimsby Town F.C. players
Manchester City F.C. players
People from the Borough of Erewash
Footballers from Derbyshire
Sheffield United F.C. players